Visa requirements for Kazakhstani citizens are administrative entry restrictions by the authorities of other states placed on citizens of Kazakhstan. As of 5 April 2022, Kazakhstani citizens had visa-free or visa on arrival access to 75 countries and territories, ranking the Kazakhstani passport 68th in terms of travel freedom according to the Henley Passport Index 2023.

The tables indicate visa requirements for normal passport holders for tourism and other visiting purposes but do not imply entry for work, journalism, etc. Most of the countries below which are labelled as "not requiring visa", request a valid return ticket, documents for confirmed accommodation arrangements and evidence of adequate funds for self-support.

Visa requirements map

Travel documents of Kazakhstani citizens

For traveling to certain countries, Kazakhstani citizens do not need to use a passport, as they may use their Kazakhstani identity card.

Changes 
Visa requirements for Kazakhstani citizens were lifted by Turkey (2 April 1992), Mongolia (2 January 1995), Barbados (21 September 1995), Albania (29 June 1998), Samoa (15 December 1998), Ecuador, (15 July 1999), Cook Islands (4 February 2002), Antigua and Barbuda (17 February 2002), Haiti (14 February 2004), Philippines (15 April 2014), Dominica (13 May 2004), Namibia (2 August 2005), Niue (11 February 2007), Saint Vincent and the Grenadines (5 March 2007), Serbia (28 May 2012), Hong Kong (26 July 2012), Colombia (2014), Argentina (1 November 2014), South Korea (29 November 2014), Indonesia (September 2015), Brazil (6 September 2016), Costa Rica (December 2016), United Arab Emirates (10 March 2018), Montenegro (15 April 2019), Oman (1 April 2022), Maldives (9 May 2022) and Andorra (5 August 2022)

Visa on arrival were introduced Cambodia (15 November 1995), Palau (2 July 1996), Cape Verde (27 March 1998), Laos (1 July 1998), Lebanon (4 March 1999), Kenya (15 March 1999), Bolivia (30 June 1999), Jordan (19 July 2000), Nicaragua (23 August 2000) Bangladesh (19 March 2001), Comores (1 July 2001), Jamaica (14 March 2002), Macao (11 May 2002), Uganda (9 November 2002), Zambia (15 January 2003), Nepal (16 February 2003), Madagascar (28 September 2003), Mauritius (19 January 2004), Tuvalu (15 October 2006), Mozambique (1 September 2008), Qatar (22 June 2017), Rwanda (1 January 2018) and Saudi Arabia (27 September 2019).

Electronic visas for Kazakhstani citizens were introduced: Australia (Electronic Visitor visa from November 2013), Lesotho (1 May 2017), Djibouti (18 February 2018), India (5 March 2018), Ethiopia (1 June 2018) and Saudi Arabia (27 September 2019).

Following countries have reinstated visa requirements for Kazakhstani citizens: Estonia (1 July 1992), Latvia (1993), Lithuania (1 November 1993), Slovakia (6 May 1994), Hungary (6 November 1996), Bulgaria (1 January 1999), Turkmenistan (19 June 1999), Romania (1 July 2000), Czech Republic (22 October 2000) and Poland (12 January 2001).

Visa requirements 
Visa requirements for holders of normal passports traveling for tourist purposes:

Dependent, Disputed, or Restricted territories
Unrecognized or partially recognized countries

Dependent and autonomous territories

Limitations on passport use
 : As a result of the Arab League boycott of Israel, many Arab League countries refuse entry to travelers whose passport shows evidence of entry into Israel or hold an unused Israeli visa.
 Iran: Admission is refused for holders of passports containing an Israeli visa/stamp in the last 12 months
 : As a result of the First Nagorno-Karabakh War between Azerbaijan and Armenia, Azerbaijan refuses entry to individuals of Armenian descent who hold Kazakhstan or other passports. It also strictly refuses entry to foreigners in general whose passport shows evidence of entry into the self-proclaimed Nagorno-Karabakh Republic, declaring them a so-called personae non gratae.

Vaccination
Many African countries, including Angola, Benin, Burkina Faso, Cameroon, Central African Republic, Chad, Democratic Republic of the Congo, Republic of the Congo, Côte d'Ivoire, Equatorial Guinea, Gabon, Ghana, Guinea, Liberia, Mali, Mauritania, Niger, Rwanda, São Tomé and Príncipe, Senegal, Sierra Leone, Uganda, Zambia require all incoming passengers to have a current International Certificate of Vaccination. Some other countries require vaccination only if the passenger is coming from an infected area.

Passport validity
Many countries require passport validity of no less than 6 months and one or two blank pages.

See also 

 Visa policy of Kazakhstan
 Kazakhstani passport
 Foreign relations of Kazakhstan

References and Notes
References

Notes

External links

Kazakhstani
Foreign relations of Kazakhstan